is a district of Chiyoda, Tokyo, Japan. It consists of Kajichō 1-chōme and Kajichō 2-chōme. As of April 1, 2007, the total population of the two districts is 371.

These districts are located on the northeastern part of Chiyoda. The combined area of Kajichō and Kanda-Kajichō borders Kanda-Sudachō to the north, Kanda-Higashimatsushitachō, Kanda-Tomiyamachō, Kanda-Konyachō, Kanda-Kitanorimonochō, Kanda-Nishifukudachō and Kanda-Mikurachō to the east, Nihonbashi-Muromachi, Nihonbashi-Hongokuchō and Nihonbashi-Honchō to the south, and Uchi-Kanda and Kanda-Tsukasachō to the west.

Modernization of addressing system has already been enforced in Kajichō 1-chōme and Kajichō 2-chōme but not yet in Kanda-Kajichō 3-chōme. Formerly, Kajichō 1-chōme and Kajichō 2-chōme were "Kanda-Kajichō 1-chōme" and "Kanda-Kajichō 2-chōme," respectively. In general, a districts with "Kanda-" prefix represents that the district belonged to the former  and is yet to undergo addressing system modernization.

Kajichō and Kanda-Kajichō are business districts near Kanda Station, home to a number of office buildings and stores. JR Kanda Station is located in Kajichō 2-chōme.

Education
 operates public elementary and junior high schools. Chiyoda Elementary School (千代田小学校) is the zoned elementary school for Kajichō 1-2 chōme and Kanda-Kajichō 3-chōme. There is a freedom of choice system for junior high schools in Chiyoda Ward, and so there are no specific junior high school zones.

References

Districts of Chiyoda, Tokyo